Putti (singular putto) are chubby male infants in classical painting.

Putti may also refer to:
 Putti, Uganda, village in Pallisa District
 Lya De Putti (1897–1931) Hungarian film actress

See also
 Putti Plutti Pott and Santa's Beard, Norwegian children's musical in which Putti Plutti Pott is Santa's grandson
 Puti (disambiguation)
 Putte (disambiguation)
 Puttee, strip of cloth wrapped around the lower leg
 Putty (disambiguation)